The Hotel Holly–Haswell Hotel is a historic district in Haswell, Colorado, containing a two-story hotel, a filling station, a bunkhouse, a chicken coop, and a non-contributing garage.
It was deemed locally significant as one of the first business buildings in Haswell, and having been run as a hostelry for 60 years, and for association with the Hollingsworth and Rebel and Covalt families, each of which operated the hotel.

It was listed on the National Register of Historic Places in 2013.

References 

1907 establishments in Colorado
Buildings and structures in Kiowa County, Colorado
Hotel buildings completed in 1907
Hotel buildings on the National Register of Historic Places in Colorado
Historic districts on the National Register of Historic Places in Colorado
National Register of Historic Places in Kiowa County, Colorado